Singapore sent a delegation to compete at the 2018 Winter Olympics in Pyeongchang, South Korea, from 9 to 25 February 2018. This marked the debut for Singapore at the Winter Olympics. The country was represented by single competitor, speed skater Cheyenne Goh. She did not advance out of the qualifying round of her event, the women's 1500 metres race.

Background

Singapore, then a British colony, first joined Olympic competition at the 1948 Summer Olympics, and have participated in every Summer Olympic Games since, except 1964, where Singaporean athletes competed as part of the Malaysian team, and the boycotted 1980 Summer Olympics. This was Singapore's debut appearance at a Winter Olympic Games. The only athlete Singapore qualified was Cheyenne Goh, a short-track speed skater. A former Olympian in table tennis for Singapore in the 2004 Summer Olympics, Tan Paey Fern, was named as the chef de mission of the team. Goh was chosen as the flag bearer for the parade of nations during the opening ceremony, while a volunteer from the PyeongChang Organizing Committee for the 2018 Olympic & Paralympic Winter Games carried the Singaporean flag for the closing ceremony. On carrying the flag, Goh said "I'm really excited and it's a pretty big honour to be able to be doing this, I think it's really cool,"

Short track speed skating

On 23 November it was announced by the International Skating Union (ISU) that Singapore had received a qualifying place for the women's 1500 m speed skating competition. Goh, who was 18 years old at the time of the Peyongchang Olympics, put her studies on hold to pursue competing in the Olympics. She was born in Singapore, but has lived in Canada since the age of four. The women's 1500 metres race took place on 17 February. Goh finished fifth in her heat with a time of 2 minutes and 36.9 seconds, and failed to advance to the semi-finals.

See also
Singapore at the 2017 Asian Winter Games
Singapore at the 2018 Commonwealth Games

References

Nations at the 2018 Winter Olympics
2018
Winter Olympics